Trichostema ruygtii, with the common name Napa bluecurls, is a species of flowering plant in the mint family.  It was first described to science in 2006.

Distribution
The plant is endemic to California in the northern San Francisco Bay Area, where it is known from the southern Mayacamas Mountains, in Napa County and into western Solano County.

Its habitats include chaparral, oak woodland, mixed evergreen forest, and vernal pools in  grasslands.

Description
Trichostema ruygtii is an annual herb that grows under  in height.  The stems and lanceolate leaves have short hairs.

The flowers are a pale lavender in color. Its bloom period is June to October.

Conservation
The species is threatened by agriculture and development. Trichostema ruygtii is listed as a Critically endangered species on the California Native Plant Society Inventory of Rare and Endangered Plants.

References

External links
Calflora Database: Trichostema ruygtii (Napa bluecurls)
 Jepson Manual eFlora (TJM2) treatment of Trichostema ruygtii
UC Photos gallery: Trichostema ruygtii

ruygtii
Endemic flora of California
Natural history of the California chaparral and woodlands
Natural history of the California Coast Ranges
Mayacamas Mountains
Natural history of Napa County, California
Natural history of Solano County, California
Plants described in 2006
Endemic flora of the San Francisco Bay Area
Critically endangered flora of California